Pirqa Pata (Aymara pirqa wall, pata step, also spelled Percapata) is a mountain in the Bolivian Andes  which reaches a height of approxilamtely . It is situated in the La Paz Department, Sud Yungas Province, Yanacachi Municipality. Pirqa Pata lies east of the main range of the Cordillera Real, north of Mururata and southeast of Sirk'i Qullu and Pirqata.

References 

Mountains of La Paz Department (Bolivia)